Clough Dene is a village in County Durham, England. It is situated a short distance to the north of Tantobie, a few miles from Stanley and Annfield Plain.

References

Villages in County Durham
Stanley, County Durham